Jacqueline Jeanne Paule Maillan (11 January 1923 - 12 May 1992) was a French actress with a career spanning almost five decades, known primarily for her forty theatre productions, she also appeared in more than fifty films (1947 to 1992) and is remembered as one of the greatest comedic thespians of her generation and even nicknamed "The Louis de Funès in skirt". After working on the classics of French theatre, she excelled in playing exuberant, strong and powerful women in vaudeville and boulevard on stage or in such films as Jean-Marie Poiré's cult Gramps Is in the Resistance (French: Papy fait de la résistance,1983) before pioneering stand-up in France. Her husband Michel Emer, who was Edith Piaf's composer, helped her hide her bisexuality (if not her sole homosexuality) from the public as they lived as a 'free couple' when it was then deeply stigmatized during the 1950s and 1960s. She was made a Chevalier (French: Knight) of the Légion d'honneur and Officer of the Ordre des Arts et des Lettres.

Selected filmography

References

External links 

1923 births
1992 deaths
French stage actresses
French film actresses
French television actresses
Chevaliers of the Légion d'honneur
Officiers of the Ordre des Arts et des Lettres
Death in Paris
Burials at the Cimetière parisien de Bagneux
20th-century French women